Audiotricz are a duo from Nunspeet, Netherlands, consisting of Kenneth Kroes (20/01/1990) and Leon Benschop (27/12/1990) who perform and produce music together within the Hardstyle genre.

History 

Leon and Kenneth have known each other since they were young children as they grew up as friends and began producing Hardstyle together in 2013. Both Leon and Kenneth had a background in sound design in other genres prior to becoming a duo and producing hardstyle.

On 28 June 2013, Audiotricz signed to Dutch hardstyle record label Scantraxx Recordz and celebrated with their first release "We Are Audiotricz EP" which featured three tracks: "Dance No More" with Atmozfears, "Don't Hold Back" and "Dreamliner". Since their first release, they have grown quickly within the Hardstyle scene and have gained support from highly recognized artists within Hardstyle such as TNT (Technoboy and Tuneboy), The Prophet and Noisecontrollers, who invited Audiotricz as a supporting act on his 2015 All Around Australian Tour.

Since the conception of Audiotricz, they have gained spots at hardstyle events such as Defqon.1, Qlimax, Hard Bass, XXlerator Outdoor, Mysteryland Chile and represented Scantraxx Recordz at the Hard Dance Event Live in the Heineken Music Hall during Amsterdam Dance Event.

Releases

References

External links
Audiotricz on Facebook

Hardstyle musicians